Mount Afdem is a mountain range in Ethiopia.

Climate
Elevation is the major factor in temperature levels, with the higher areas, on average, as 10 °C (17 °F) cooler, day or night. The overnight lows are not like the "Garden of Eden" because, at night, heavy clothes or blankets are needed, in the highlands, when the temperature drops to about 50–53 °F (10–12.2 °C) every night.

References

Mountain ranges of Ethiopia
Ethiopian Highlands